Surkamp (also Romanized as Sūrkamp; also known as Sūr Kamb, Sūr Kamb, Surkhum, Sūrkhūn, Sūrkhūnī, Sūrkomb, and Surkum) is a village in Jahliyan Rural District, in the Central District of Konarak County, Sistan and Baluchestan Province, Iran. At the 2006 census, its population was 824, in 176 families.

References 

Populated places in Konarak County